

Events 
 January–June 
 January – The Netherlands adopts the Gregorian calendar.
 February – The Spanish seize Brussels.
 April 24 – Pope Sixtus V succeeds Pope Gregory XIII, as the 227th pope.
 May 19 – Spain seizes English ships in Spanish ports, precipitating the Anglo-Spanish War (1585–1604).
 June 11 – The magnitude 9.2 1585 Aleutian Islands earthquake unleashes a tsunami in the Pacific Ocean, killing many people in Hawaii and reportedly striking Japan.

 July–December 
 July 7 – The Treaty of Nemours forces King Henry III of France to capitulate to the demands of the Catholic League, triggering the Eighth War of Religion (also known as the War of the Three Henrys) in France.
 August 8 – English explorer John Davis enters Cumberland Sound in Baffin Island, in his quest for the Northwest Passage.
 August 14 – Queen Elizabeth I of England agrees to establish a protectorate over the Netherlands.
 August 17
 Fall of Antwerp: Antwerp is captured by Spanish forces under the Prince of Parma, who orders Protestants to leave the city. As a result, over half of the 100,000 inhabitants flee to the northern provinces. Furthermore, upon hearing of the capture of Antwerp, a relief fleet sent to raise the siege instead blockades the Scheldt River, preventing any and all ships from reaching Antwerp for two centuries. This effectively destroys Antwerp's position as an important trade city and de facto capital of the Dutch provinces. Its position is taken over by various northern cities, most prominently Amsterdam.
 A first group of colonists sent by Sir Walter Raleigh, under the charge of Ralph Lane, lands in the New World to create Roanoke Colony on Roanoke Island, off the coast of North Carolina. This group will depart the following June.
 August 20 – The Treaty of Nonsuch is signed, committing England to support the Dutch Revolt, thus entering the Eighty Years' War.
 November 28 – Anglo-Spanish War: Santiago, Cape Verde is captured by Francis Drake. 

 Date unknown 
 Invasion of Shikoku: Toyotomi Hideyoshi seizes the island of Shikoku from Chōsokabe Motochika.
 The Kingdom of Luba is founded.
 History of chocolate in Spain: First recorded commercial importation of chocolate to Europe, from Veracruz in Mexico to Seville in Spain.

Births 

 January 5 – Carlo Emanuele Pio di Savoia, Italian Catholic cardinal (d. 1641)
 January 6 – Claude Favre de Vaugelas, Savoyard grammarian and man of letters (d. 1650)
 January 8 – Henriette Catherine de Joyeuse, Duchess of Joyeuse (d. 1656)
 January 9 – Sir Richard Grosvenor, 1st Baronet, English politician (d. 1645)
 January 23 – Mary Ward, English Catholic Religious Sister (d. 1645)
 January 24 – Anna Maria of Solms-Sonnewalde, Countess consort of Hohenlohe-Langenburg (d. 1634)
 January 27 – Hendrick Avercamp, Dutch painter (d. 1634)
 January 28 – Domenico II Contarini, Doge of Venice (d. 1675)
 January 31 – Daniel Schwenter, German Orientalist (d. 1636)
 February 2
 Judith Quiney, William Shakespeare's youngest daughter (d. 1662)
 Hamnet Shakespeare, William Shakespeare's only son (d. 1596)
 February 25 – Pieter van den Broecke, Dutch merchant (d. 1640)
 March 2 – John Macias, Spanish Dominican lay brother (d. 1645)
 March 5
 Frederick I, Landgrave of Hesse-Homburg, founder of the junior line Hesse-Homburg (d. 1638)
 John George I, Elector of Saxony (d. 1656)
 March 6 – Francesco Cornaro, Doge of Venice (d. 1656)
 March 16 – Gerbrand Adriaensz Bredero, Dutch writer (d. 1618)
 March 22 – Krzysztof Radziwiłł, Polish nobleman (d. 1640)
 April 6 – Marzio Ginetti, Italian Catholic cardinal (d. 1671)
 April 28 – George Goring, 1st Earl of Norwich, English soldier and politician (d. 1663)
 May 1 – Sophia Olelkovich Radziwill, Polish-Lithuanian noble (d. 1612)
 May 5 – Vincenzo Carafa, Italian Jesuit priest and spiritual writer (d. 1649)
 May 6 – Guy XX de Laval, French noble (d. 1605)
 May 12 – John Oglander, English politicians (d. 1655)
 June 11 – Evert Horn, Swedish soldier (d. 1615)
 June 13 – Antonio Ruiz de Montoya, Peruvian and Paraguayan linguist (d. 1652)
 June 24 – Johannes Lippius, German theologian, philosopher, composer and music theorist (d. 1612)
 July 2 – Jean Guiton, French Huguenot ship owner (d. 1654)
 July 11
 Nicolaus Hunnius, German theologian (d. 1643)
 Timothy Turner, British serjeant-at-law (d. 1677)
 July 26 – Dániel Esterházy, Hungarian noble (d. 1654)
 August 3 – Sir Thomas Burdett, 1st Baronet, of Bramcote, Sheriff of Derbyshire (d. 1647)
 August 5 – Jesper Brochmand, Danish bishop (d. 1652)
 August 25 – Giovanni Biliverti, Italian painter (d. 1644)
 August 26 – Peter Lauremberg, German writer and professor (d. 1639)
 September 9 – Armand Jean du Plessis, Cardinal Richelieu, French statesman and 4th Prime Minister of France (d. 1642)
 September 15 – Ottavio Vannini, Italian painter (d. 1640)
 September 26 – Antonio Franco, Italian Catholic bishop, prelate of Santa Lucia del Mela (d. 1626)
 September 27 – John Strangways, English politician (d. 1666)
 October 4 – Anna of Tyrol, Holy Roman Empress (d. 1618)
 October 8 – Heinrich Schütz, German composer (d. 1672)
 October 10 – Sir Edward Hussey, 1st Baronet, English politician (d. 1648)
 October 11 – Johann Heermann, German poet, hymn-writer (d. 1647)
 October 15 – Louis Cappel, French Protestant churchman and scholar (d. 1658)
 October 28 – Cornelius Jansen, French bishop of Ypres and religious reformer (d. 1638)
 October – John Ball, English puritan divine (d. 1640)
 November 1
 Jan Brożek, Polish mathematician, physician and astronomer (d. 1652)
 Adriaan Pauw (d. 1653)
 November 2 – Rudolf von Colloredo, Austrian field marshal (d. 1657)
 November 5 – Sir John St John, 1st Baronet, English baronet (d. 1648)
 November 26 – Herman op den Graeff, Dutch bishop (d. 1642)
 November 30 – Filippo Benedetto de Sio, Italian Catholic prelate, Bishop of Boiano (1641–1651) and Bishop of Caiazzo (1623–1641) (d. 1651)
 December 3 – Matthew Wren, influential English clergyman (d. 1667)
 December 4
 John Cotton, clergyman in England and the American colonies, founder of Boston (d. 1652)
 December 13 – William Drummond of Hawthornden, Scottish poet (d. 1649)
 December 16 – Livia della Rovere, Italian noble (d. 1641)
 December 25 – Christian, Count of Waldeck-Wildungen (1588–1637) (d. 1637)
 December 31
 Gonzalo Fernández de Córdoba, Spanish general (d. 1645)
 Sumitomo Masatomo, Japanese businessman (d. 1652)
 date unknown
 Zachary Boyd, Scottish religious writer (d. 1653)
 Ambrose Barlow, Catholic priest and martyr (d. 1641)
 Thomas Preston, 1st Viscount Tara, Irish soldier (d. 1655)
 Lucilio Vanini, Italian free-thinker (d. 1619)
 Alexander Whitaker, Virginia Colony religious leader (d. 1616)
 Fang Weiyi, Chinese poet, calligrapher, painter and literature historian (d. 1668)

Deaths 

 January 16 – Edward Clinton, 1st Earl of Lincoln, English admiral (b. 1512)
 February 6 – Edmund Plowden, English legal scholar (b. 1518)
 February 13 – Alfonso Salmeron, Spanish Jesuit biblical scholar (b. 1515)
 March 10 – Rembert Dodoens, Flemish physician and botanist (b. 1517)
 April 3 – Thomas Goldwell, English ecclesiastic (b. 1501)
 April 22 – Henry of Saxe-Lauenburg, Prince-Archbishop of Bremen, Prince-Bishop of Osnabrück and Paderborn (b. 1550)
 April 10 – Pope Gregory XIII (b. 1502)
 May 15 – Niwa Nagahide, Japanese warlord (b. 1535)
 June 4 – Muretus, French humanist (b. 1526)
 June 18 – Jacques, Duke of Nemours, French nobleman and soldier (b. 1531)
 June 21 – Henry Percy, 8th Earl of Northumberland, English nobleman and conspirator, suicide (b. 1532)
 June 19 – Francisco de Holanda, Portuguese artist (b. 1517)
 June 22 – Simon Sulzer, Swiss theologian (b. 1508)
 July 6 – Thomas Aufield, English Catholic martyr (b. 1552)
 July 28 – Francis Russell, 2nd Earl of Bedford, English nobleman, soldier and politician (b. 1527)
 c. July? – Shimon Lavi, Sephardi kabbalist (b. 1486)
 August 5 or August 6 – Yermak Timofeyevich, Cossack leader and explorer of Siberia
 September 6 – Luca Cambiasi, Italian painter (b. 1527)
 October 1 – Anne of Denmark, Electress of Saxony (b. 1532)
 October 19 – Johannes Crato von Krafftheim, German humanist and physician (b. 1519)
 October 29 – Özdemiroğlu Osman Pasha, Ottoman (Turkish) grand vizier (b. 1526)
 November 2 – Tachibana Dōsetsu, Japanese daimyō (b. 1513)
 November 23 – Thomas Tallis, English composer (b. c. 1510)
 November 28 – Hernando Franco, Spanish composer (b. 1532)
 December – Pierre de Ronsard, French poet (b. 1524)
 December 4 – John Willock, Scottish reformer (b. c. 1515)
 December 22 – Vittoria Accoramboni, Italian noblewoman (b. 1557)
 approx. date – Qiu Zhu, Chinese painter
 date unknown
Taqi ad-Din Muhammad ibn Ma'ruf, Turkish scientist (b. 1526)
Stanisław Lubomirski, Polish nobleman
Nguyễn Bỉnh Khiêm, Vietnamese administrator, educator, poet, sage and later a saint of the Cao Dai religion (b. 1491)

References